Arne Røisland (24 June 1923 – 30 October 1980) was a Norwegian footballer. He played in one match for the Norway national football team in 1947.

References

External links
 

1923 births
1980 deaths
Norwegian footballers
Norway international footballers
Place of birth missing
Association footballers not categorized by position